Alvin Alden (March 1, 1818 – August 18, 1882) was an American businessman and politician.

Born in Stafford, Connecticut or Stamford, Connecticut, Alden moved to Randolph, Wisconsin Territory in 1844 and then moved to Portage, Wisconsin in 1851. He worked for the Wisconsin Secretary of State as an insurance clerk and a loan agent for the North Western Life Insurance Company. He served as mayor of Portage, Wisconsin. In 1858, Alden served in the Wisconsin State Assembly and was a Democrat. Alden died in Eau Claire, Wisconsin.

Notes

1818 births
1882 deaths
People from Stafford, Connecticut
People from Stamford, Connecticut
People from Randolph, Wisconsin
Businesspeople from Wisconsin
Mayors of places in Wisconsin
19th-century American politicians
People from Portage, Wisconsin
19th-century American businesspeople
Democratic Party members of the Wisconsin State Assembly